Harry Verelst may refer to:

 Harry Verelst (colonial governor) (1734–1785), colonial administrator and the governor of Bengal, 1767–1769
 Harry Verelst (cricketer) (1846–1918), English amateur cricketer